Platelets is a peer-reviewed medical journal covering all aspects of platelet-related research. The editors-in-chief are Steve Watson and Paul Harrison (University of Birmingham). It was established in 1990 and is published by Taylor & Francis.

External links

Publications established in 1990
Hematology journals
Taylor & Francis academic journals
English-language journals